Father and Son (German: Vater und Sohn) is a 1918 German silent drama film directed by William Wauer and starring Albert Bassermann, Elsa Bassermann and Gertrud Kanitz.

Cast
 Albert Bassermann
 Elsa Bassermann
 Gertrud Kanitz

References

Bibliography
 Bock, Hans-Michael & Bergfelder, Tim. The Concise CineGraph. Encyclopedia of German Cinema. Berghahn Books, 2009.

External links

1918 films
Films of the German Empire
German silent feature films
Films directed by William Wauer
1910s German films